Andrew Warren is an American fashion designer and social media personality based in NYC. He is the founder and designer at the female label Just Drew, also known as the creator of the social group Snap Pack. He is also the co-founder and creative director of CollXab.

Early life 
Warren was born on January 17, 1993, to Michael Warren, a real estate investor, and Marcy Warren. His grandfather was David Warren, a well-known clothing manufacturer and designer who founded The Warren Group in the 1960s, which sold clothes in department stores such as Neiman Marcus and Saks Fifth Avenue. His name is inscribed on the "Garment Worker" statue on Seventh Avenue. Warren's family sold The Warren Group in 1998.

Career 
In 2013, Warren launched the fashion label Just Drew. On February 14, 2016, he launched his first collection, titled 'It Girl', at Gotham Hall in New York City. Tiffany Trump was also modelled for the event. His Spring 2017 collection made its debut during New York Fashion Week. According to Warren, his friends' own fashion senses serve as his design inspiration.

In 2020, he signed up as a social media influencer with Next Model Management.

In 2021, Warren co-founded CollXab, an influencer marketing firm, with former publicist and events director Arleigh Banner.

Personal life 
Warren is reportedly the creator of the Snap Pack, a circle of socialites that also includes Gaia Matisse, the great-great-granddaughter of French artist Henri Matisse, Kyra Kennedy, the great-great niece of John F. Kennedy, Tiffany Trump, the daughter of Donald Trump, EJ Johnson, Peter Brant II, Ezra J. William, Reya Benitez, and actress Bella Thorne.

Warren spoke out against the barrage of hateful posts and death threats made at Tiffany Trump and her family during her father's 2016 presidential campaign.

References 

Living people
1993 births
American fashion designers
People from New York (state)